Elford is a civil parish in the district of Lichfield, Staffordshire, England.  It contains 28 buildings that are recorded in the National Heritage List for England.  Of these, one is listed at Grade II*, the middle of the three grades, and the others are at Grade II, the lowest grade.  The parish contains the village of Elford and the surrounding countryside.  Most of the listed buildings are houses and associated structures, cottages, farmhouses and farm buildings, the earlier of which are timber framed or have a timber-framed core.  The other listed buildings are a church, a public house, a former smithy, a bridge, and three mileposts.


Key

Buildings

References

Citations

Sources

Lists of listed buildings in Staffordshire